Maigret is a British television series made by the BBC and which – following a pilot episode broadcast in 1959 – ran for 52 episodes from 1960 to 1963.  

Based on the Maigret stories of Georges Simenon, the series starred Rupert Davies in the title role.

Unlike most BBC series produced in the 1960s, all episodes (bar the pilot) have survived intact, and are available as a complete set on DVD and Blu-ray.

In 2022 the series was broadcast by UK television channel Talking Pictures TV.

Cast
The series starred Rupert Davies as the Police Judiciaire detective Commissaire Jules Maigret, who took up the role in 1960 after Basil Sydney, who had played Maigret in the pilot episode, was unable to continue. 

The main cast were:-
 Ewen Solon as Lucas  
 Neville Jason as Lapointe  
 Victor Lucas as Torrence
 Helen Shingler as Madame Maigret  

Episodes included such well-known faces as Stratford Johns, Leon Cortez, Terence Alexander, Roger Delgado, William Franklyn, Michael Goodliffe, and Barry Foster, among others.

Although staying largely true to the storyline of the books, the series featured only three of Maigret's team of detectives (the "faithful four"), omitting any casting for Janvier, although the character is mentioned in several episodes.

The choice of Davies to play Maigret was enthusiastically approved by Simenon himself. Remembering the role in a 1964 interview Davies said "When Andrew Osborn, the producer of the show, offered me the part on Good Friday in 1960, I knew very little about Maigret. I knew he was a famous French fictional detective, but that was all." Rather than read the books to get the feel for the character, Davies thought it would be better to meet Maigret's creator and hear from him how he saw the character. The BBC agreed and a meeting was arranged between Davies and Simenon in Lausanne.

"The moment Simenon saw me he shouted: "C'est Maigret, c'est Maigret. You are the flesh and bones of Maigret!" Davies later remembered. "That was a wonderful beginning. Then he drove us to his lovely château in the village of Échandens, where I met his wife. Later he began to coach me in Maigret's idiosyncrasies."

Simenon himself said of Davies "At last, I have found the perfect Maigret!"

Production
The series was written by a set of ten writers, each contributing individual episodes; the most prolific being Giles Cooper, credited with nineteen episodes, and Roger East, with twelve.

Directing was similarly shared by sixteen directors, with Gerard Glaister and Terence Williams responsible for eight each, Andrew Osborn seven, and Eric Tayler six.
Each episode was shot in black-and-white and lasted 50 minutes, and (as it was made for the BBC) was intended to be screened without commercial breaks. It was shot mainly in studio, though many of the exteriors were filmed on location in Paris.

Theme music and various incidental music was composed by Ron Grainer for which he won an Ivor Novello award. Apart from the pilot, all 52 episodes remain within the BBC's archives.

Episodes
(with dates of first broadcast on BBC TV)

Home media
In May 2021, Network Distributing announced the Blu-Ray release of the series (to be released August 2021), with a DVD release soon to follow.

References

Sources

External links

Maigret on Whirligig
Maigret fansite
Maigret on Television Heaven
 Georges Simenon novels (French Wikipedia)

1960 British television series debuts
1960s British crime television series
1960s British drama television series
1963 British television series endings
BBC television dramas
Black-and-white British television shows
British drama television series
Detective television series
English-language television shows
Television shows based on works by Georges Simenon
Serial drama television series
Television shows based on Belgian novels